Christ Church is located on Stockton Lane in Heworth, York, England. It was opened in March 1964.

It has been called "one of the most pleasing modern churches." The building design is attributed to 'M. Menim;' this may have been A. Michael Mennim, who designed a number of churches in the York area.

The church was originally a daughter church of Holy Trinity Church in Heworth, but was separated into its own ecclesiastical parish in 1998. The church is also used as a dance-hall and meeting place for local community groups, such as the York Minster Scout Group.

References

External links
Heworth Christ Church York

Christ Church
20th-century Church of England church buildings